Fa'anana Jerome Grey (born 23 March 1947) is a Samoan-American singer, songwriter, musician and composer.

Career
Jerome Grey is a musician based in California. His song "We are Samoa"  was popular and became an unofficial anthem for the country.

Among the musicians he has worked with are Seminary Uesele and Harry Sinapi, collectively known as the Samoan Three.

He released recordings on New Zealand-based Hibiscus Records. His first single was "Olaga O Samoa". The Samoa three, the group he started in 1971 was a popular trio who played contemporary, oldies and ballads including covers of Frank Sinatra, Tony Bennett, Nat King Cole and Sammy Davis. They were best known for their versatility in cultural songs, from Spanish to Latin, Hawaiian, Tahitian and Fijian. He raised the house with his rendition of the Hava Nagila.

Grey's passion was country music. He loved the humour and the story-telling about everyday life. He enjoyed covering Johnny Cash, George Strait, Kenny Rogers and Glen Campbell.

With two children and his wife he returned to Samoa to help with his father in-law's restaurant, Soli's. While there he recorded many island songs. The Ava band LP was released on Bluewater Records, produced by Frank Day and executive producer Tom Moffatt. They recorded two other albums in Hawaii and Hollywood at Conway Records.

In January 2007 Grey suffered a mild stroke while working at Mai Tai in Long Beach, California. After four months he was back to work, slowly improving.

In August 2021 he was named as "Polynesia’s Artist of the Decade" by the Asia Pacific Cultural Center in Tacoma, Washington. In July 2022 the Pacific Music Awards announced that he would receive their 2022 lifetime achievement award.

Family 
His eldest son Tinifu Loa Grey is a singer, composer and musician. Youngest son Taumata is a songwriter and lead guitarist for Common Kings. His daughter, Sisa Grey, is an actress.  Anamativa works for the health industry and is an event planner for charities.  Julie works for an insurance company, but shares the family joy and extraordinary gift of music.

Discography

45 RPM EP
 Jerome Grey at the Intercontinental, Songs of Samoa – Hisbiscus Records HE.6

Albums
 We Are Samoa – Jerome Grey Productions / Reminisce Music Publishing (1980)
 Footprints (compact disc)
 Coconut Woman – - Jerome Grey Productions / Reminisce Music Publishing (1989)

The Ava Band

 Ava'' – Bluewater Records- STP 633

References

Links
 

Samoan music
Hibiscus Records artists
Living people
1947 births
People from Apia